"Send the Pain Below" is a song by Chevelle, released as the second single from their second album, Wonder What's Next (2002). It is one of their biggest hits, reaching  1 on the Modern Rock Tracks chart on July 5, 2003, for a week, and staying on the chart for 36 weeks. It hit No. 1 on the Mainstream Rock Tracks chart a week later on July 12, 2003, and stayed for 35 weeks, including three more intermittently on top. It placed No. 65 on the Billboard Hot 100, lower than their prior single, "The Red", at No. 56.

The song's music video, directed by Jeff Richter, revolves around a snowboarder and his difficulties in striving for excellent performance. The band is seen playing the song in a dark room, with their breath creating fog in the cold air.

The song is included in the video game Donkey Konga 2.

Critical reception
Loudwire ranked it the third greatest Chevelle song.

Charts

Certifications

See also
 List of Billboard number-one alternative singles of the 2000s
 List of Billboard Mainstream Rock number-one songs of the 2000s

References

External links
 

2002 songs
2003 singles
Chevelle (band) songs
Epic Records singles
Music videos directed by Jeff Richter
Song recordings produced by Garth Richardson
Songs written by Pete Loeffler
Songs written by Sam Loeffler